was a town located in Miyoshi District, Tokushima Prefecture, Japan.

As of 2003, the town had an estimated population of 6,069 and a density of 110.67 persons per km². The total area was 54.84 km².

On March 1, 2006, Miyoshi, along with the town of Mikamo (also from Miyoshi District), was merged to create the town of Higashimiyoshi.

External links
 Higashimiyoshi official website 
 Merger Information Page 

Dissolved municipalities of Tokushima Prefecture
Higashimiyoshi, Tokushima